Callum O'Hare (born 1 May 1998) is an English professional footballer who plays as an attacking midfielder for Championship club Coventry City F.C. He has previously played for Aston Villa, as well as a loan spell with Carlisle United. O'Hare initially joined Coventry on loan from Aston Villa in 2019 and was part of the side that won the 2019–20 EFL League One title.

O'Hare is a product of the Aston Villa Academy, spending fifteen years at the club, and has represented England at Under-20 level.

Career

Aston Villa 
O'Hare joined Aston Villa at the age of 7, and progressed through the development teams before signing his first professional contract with the club in 2015. He played for both Villa's U18 and U23 squads, making 33 appearances and scoring 2 goals prior to his first professional appearance. On 9 August 2017 O'Hare made his debut for the first team in Aston Villa's 2–1 win in the first round of the League Cup against Colchester United. His league debut came 3 days later as a substitute in a 0–3 loss at Cardiff City in the Championship. O'Hare made 6 more first team appearances for Aston Villa during the 2017–18 season.

Loan to Carlisle 
On 29 January 2019, O'Hare signed on loan with League Two club Carlisle United until the end of the 2018-19 season. Upon joining the club he explained that the reason for the loan deal was to get more game time for his development, saying “I’ve had a good taste of football with Villa but I want to be playing game to game and showing everybody what I can do. I want to prove myself and that’s why I think this is a good move for me.”. He made 16 appearances for Carlisle, scoring 3 goals, as they finished 11th in the league.

Coventry City 
On 22 August 2019, O'Hare signed with EFL League One club Coventry City on a season-long loan. He made 40 appearances and scored 4 goals for Coventry before the season was suspended due to the COVID-19 pandemic. On 9 June 2020 the League One season was officially ended and Coventry were crowned champions, securing promotion to the Championship. O'Hare returned to Aston Villa ahead of the resumption of the Premier League season. On 25 June 2020, O'Hare was released by Aston Villa.

Following his release from Villa, O'Hare signed permanently for Coventry on 15 July 2020 on a three-year deal. He scored his first Championship goal in Coventry's 3–2 victory over QPR, their first league win of the season.

Having been stretchered off just ten minutes into a 3–1 defeat to Sheffield United on 26 December 2022, it was later confirmed that O'Hare had suffered an ACL injury that would rule him out for at least nine months.

International career
Born in England, O'Hare is of Irish descent. He has represented England at U20 level.

Career statistics

Honours

Aston Villa U23s 
Premier League Cup: 2017–18

Coventry City 
EFL League One: 2019–20

References

External links

England profile at The Football Association

1998 births
Living people
English footballers
England youth international footballers
English people of Irish descent
Association football forwards
Aston Villa F.C. players
Carlisle United F.C. players
Coventry City F.C. players
English Football League players
Sportspeople from Solihull